Adam Józef Ignacy Prażmowski (1821–1885) was a Polish astronomer and astrophysicist of the 19th century. He worked in 1839 to 1850 at the Warsaw Observatory. Among his many discoveries, he discovered the polarized emissions from the sun's corona in 1860.

External links

 Short Biography

19th-century Polish astronomers
1821 births
1885 deaths